History Rocks was a non-fictional, educational television program shown on The History Channel. Each episode explains eight historical events, arranged by decade, through multimedia presentations consisting of photographs, archival footage, popular music and pop-up trivia. Six episodes were produced, with two focusing on 1960s, 1970s and 1980s. At one time, the History Channel website discussed a fourth special on the topic of Sex, but the official History Rocks''' website at the History Channel no longer mentions it.

Although the show was originally hosted by Meat Loaf, subsequent airings of the videos edited Meat Loaf out and removed his segues between videos.

List of Segments

1960s
 Violence Batters 1968 Democratic Convention / "My Generation" by The Who
 The Draft Lottery / "Get Together" by The Youngbloods
 First of the Muscle Cars: Pontiac GTO / "Born to Be Wild" by Steppenwolf
 Marilyn Monroe's Mysterious Death / "Nights in White Satin" by The Moody Blues
 Smoking is Hazardous / "Ring of Fire"
 The Pill Begins Sexual Revolution / "Time of the Season" by The Zombies
 G.I. Joe / "Bend Me, Shape Me" by The Outsiders
 Summer of Love / "Sunshine of Your Love" by Cream
 Cassius Clay changes his name / "Thank You (Falettinme Be Mice Elf Agin)" by Sly and the Family Stone
 Castro Must Die! / "Feelin' Alright" by Joe Cocker
Growing up in the 1960s / "Sunshine Superman" by Donovan
 The JFK Conspiracy / "I Can See for Miles" by The Who
 LSD and Timothy Leary / "White Room" by Cream
 Race for Space / "Magic Carpet Ride" by Steppenwolf
 Vietnam Soldier / "A Whiter Shade of Pale" by Procol Harum
  Volkswagen in the 1960s / "Venus" by The Shocking Blue

1970s
 Munich massacre / "Hold Your Head Up" by Argent
 The Beginning of Video Games / "You Ain't Seen Nothing Yet" by Bachman-Turner Overdrive
 Fall of Saigon / "Free Bird" by Lynyrd Skynyrd
 CB Radio / "Jessica" by The Allman Brothers Band
 Jonestown / "(Don't Fear) The Reaper" by Blue Öyster Cult
 Disappearance of Jimmy Hoffa / "Takin' Care of Business" by Bachman-Turner Overdrive
 History of the Concorde / "Come Sail Away" by Styx
 Saturday Night Massacre / "Saturday Night's Alright for Fighting" by Elton John
 History of the Muscle Car / "Cars" by Gary Numan
 Elvis meets Richard Nixon / "Why Can't We Be Friends?" by War
 Iranian Revolution / "The Logical Song" by Supertramp
 Three Mile Island accident / "Message in a Bottle" by The Police

1980s
 Perestroika
 America's War On Drugs (The crack epidemic) / "Electric Avenue" by Eddy Grant
 Going Mobile / "Call Me" by Blondie
 Pac-Man Fever / "Everybody Have Fun Tonight" by Wang Chung
 Black Monday / "Urgent" by Foreigner
 Mount St. Helens eruption / "Should I Stay or Should I Go" by The Clash
 Supercars / "Obsession" by Animotion
 The Berlin Wall / "We're Not Gonna Take It" by Twisted Sister
 Reagan Meets Gorbachev / "Cult of Personality" by Living Colour

Future airings
Although the History Channel frequently aired the series during the summer of 2007, the official website states that there are no plan to air the episodes in the immediate future. Most of the videos are available, however, for on-demand online viewing. The full set of segments from the 1960s are currently available. The shop at the History Channel's website has a section devoted to History Rocks, but the videos available for purchase are only related to the individual segments and do not contain the actual videos aired on television.

Similarities to other showsHistory Rocks shares many similarities with the BBC television show The Rock 'n' Roll Years aired between 1985 and 1994. The format of the programme, which was based on the BBC Radio 1 series 25 Years of Rock, was primarily of news clips with narrative subtitles set to music of the time with no presenters or voice-overs.History Rocks is also close in format to the VH1's program Pop-up Video. Although Rocks frequently discusses more serious topics than does Video, both programs have videos with identical form and structure; both videos use "info nuggets" and popular music as their central premise. Video predates Rocks by several years. Rocks has occasionally been criticized for its similarity to Video, but many of its fans support Rocks's appeal to a wider audience than other documentary shows.

Awards
In 2007, History Rocks'' was awarded "Best short form audiovisual entertainment made for mobile and/or Internet lifestyle/music" at  Mipcom's Mobile and Internet TV Awards

References

External links
 History Channel's "History Rocks" website with links to videos.
  Article about "History Rocks" in the Seattle Times
 

History (American TV channel) original programming
Rock music television series
Nostalgia television shows
Nostalgia television in the United States